The 29th CARIFTA Games was held at the National Stadium in St. George's, Grenada, on April 22–24, 2000.  A detailed report on the results was given.

Participation (unofficial)

Detailed result lists can be found on the "St. Lucia online", and on the "World Junior Athletics History"
website.  An unofficial count yields the number of about 265
athletes (154 junior (under-20) and 111 youth (under-17)) from about 21
countries:  Anguilla (5), Antigua and Barbuda (7), Bahamas (27), Barbados
(23), Belize (1), Bermuda (9), British Virgin Islands (2), Cayman Islands (7),
Dominica (3), Grenada (33), Guadeloupe (12), Guyana (2), Jamaica (55),
Martinique (35), Netherlands Antilles (1), Saint Kitts and Nevis (2), Saint
Lucia (1), Saint Vincent and the Grenadines (2), Trinidad and Tobago (35),
Turks and Caicos Islands (1), US Virgin Islands (2).

Records

A total of 12 championships records were set.

In the boys' U-20 category, Dwayne Henclewood from Jamaica threw the discus 50.41m.
 
In the girls' U-20 category, Veronica Campbell from Jamaica finished the 200 metres in 23.05 seconds.  Sheree Francis from Jamaica equalled the 1.79 m jumped by Nicola Springer, Barbados, in high jump in the year 1987.  Claudia Villeneuve from Martinique set new records in shot put (15.29m) and discus throw (50.14m).  And Keitha Moseley from Barbados achieved 3,695 points in heptathlon. Moreover, Adrianna Lamalle from Martinique reached 13.64s in the 100 metres hurdles event.

In the boys' U-17 category, the star of the games, Darrel Brown from Trinidad and Tobago, set two new records of 10.36s in 100 metres, and 21.20s in 200 metres, and (most probably) helped the Trinidad and Tobago 4 × 100 metres relay team to finish in 40.87s.  16.07 metres is the new shot put record for Kimani Kirton from Jamaica.

Finally, in the girls' U-20 category, Janill Williams from Antigua and Barbuda won the 1,500 metres in the new championships record time of 4:32.89.

Austin Sealy Award
 
The Austin Sealy Trophy for the most outstanding athlete of the games was awarded for the second time in the role to Darrel Brown from Trinidad and Tobago.  He won (at least) 2 gold medals (100m, and 200m) in the youth (U-17) category (there is no information on the composition of the Trinidad and Tobago relay teams).

Medal summary
Medal winners are published by category: Boys under 20 (Junior), Girls under 20 (Junior), Boys under 17 (Youth), and Girls under 17 (Youth).
Complete results can be found on the "St. Lucia online", and on the "World Junior Athletics History"
website.

Boys under 20 (Junior)

: Open event for both junior and youth athletes.

Girls under 20 (Junior)

: Open event for both junior and youth athletes.

Boys under 17 (Youth)

Girls under 17 (Youth)

Medal table (unofficial)

References

External links
World Junior Athletics History

CARIFTA Games
International sports competitions hosted by Grenada
2000 in Grenadian sport
CARIFTA
2000 in Caribbean sport
Athletics competitions in Grenada